The Eastern Pennsylvania Conference, known informally as EPC, EPC18, and East Penn Conference, is an athletic conference consisting of 18 large high schools from Lehigh, Monroe, Northampton, and Pike counties in the Lehigh Valley and Pocono Mountain regions of eastern and northeastern Pennsylvania. The conference is a part of District XI of the Pennsylvania Interscholastic Athletic Association (PIAA).

The Eastern Pennsylvania Conference holds many Pennsylvania and national records and milestones in high school athletic competition. Many EPC athletes have gone on to compete in the Olympics and in professional sports, including Major League Baseball, the National Basketball Association, and the National Football League. The conference's high school wrestling programs have been labeled "among the nation’s best in the sport for nearly three decades" and WIN magazine has ranked the EPC and Lehigh Valley best in the nation for wrestling.

The Eastern Pennsylvania Conference is home to two of Pennsylvania's largest high school football stadiums, the 15,000 capacity J. Birney Crum Stadium in Allentown, the state's largest high school stadium, and the 14,000 capacity Frank Banko Field at Bethlehem Area School District Stadium in Bethlehem.

History

On October 2, 2013, the Lehigh Valley Conference, consisting of 12 schools from the Lehigh Valley, voted to invite six Mountain Valley Conference schools to the conference, expanding it to a super conference of 18 large Pennsylvania high schools. The EPC was officially announced on June 4, 2014, and the conference's play began in the 2014-15 school year. The conference is widely considered one of the premier high school athletic divisions in the nation.

High schools
The 18 high school teams in the Eastern Pennsylvania Conference (with location in parentheses) are:

Mountain Division
East Stroudsburg High School North Timberwolves (Dingmans Ferry) 
East Stroudsburg High School South Cavaliers (East Stroudsburg) 
Pleasant Valley High School Bears (Brodheadsville) 
Pocono Mountain East High School Cardinals (Swiftwater) 
Pocono Mountain West High School Panthers (Pocono Summit) 
Stroudsburg High School Mountaineers (Stroudsburg) 

Skyline Division
Allentown Central Catholic High School Vikings (Allentown) 
Emmaus High School Green Hornets (Emmaus) 
Nazareth Area High School Blue Eagles (Nazareth) 
Northampton Area High School Konkrete Kids (Northampton) 
Parkland High School Trojans (Allentown) 
Whitehall High School Zephyrs (Whitehall Township)

Steel Division
Bethlehem Catholic High School Golden Hawks (Bethlehem) 
Dieruff High School Huskies (Allentown) 
Easton Area High School Red Rovers (Easton) 
Freedom High School Patriots (Bethlehem Township) 
Liberty High School Hurricanes (Bethlehem) 
William Allen High School Canaries (Allentown)

Conference championships and records

Baseball
Baseball uses the primary divisional conference alignment.

District and state championships

Boys basketball
Boys basketball uses the primary divisional conference alignment.

Conference Champions

District and state championships

Girls basketball
Girls basketball uses the primary divisional conference alignment.

Conference champions

District and state championships

Boys cross country
In boys cross country, no divisional conference alignment is used.

Conference champions

District and state championships

Individual state champions:
Mickey Collins (Easton) – 1970

Girls cross country
In girls cross country, no divisional conference alignment is used.

Conference champions

District and state championships

Individual state champions:
Janelle Thomas (Liberty) – 1992, 1994, 1995
Frances Koons (Allentown Central Catholic) – 2003
Jessica Cygan (Liberty) – 2008

Field hockey
In field hockey, no divisional conference alignment is used.

Conference champions

District and state championships

Football

Football uses the following adjusted divisional conference alignment, which changes slightly every two years:

North: Dieruff, East Stroudsburg North, East Stroudsburg South, Northampton, Pleasant Valley, Pocono Mountain East, Pocono Mountain West, Stroudsburg, and William Allen
South: Allentown Central Catholic, Bethlehem Catholic, Easton, Emmaus, Freedom, Liberty, Nazareth, Parkland, and Whitehall

From the 2014 through 2017 seasons, Northampton was in the South division. From the 2014 through 2015 seasons, Bethlehem Catholic was in the North division. For 2016-17, Allentown Central Catholic was in the North division.

Division champions

District and state championships

Golf
Golf does not use any divisional conference alignment.

Conference champions

District and state championships

Boys lacrosse
Boys lacrosse uses the following adjusted divisional conference alignment:
East: Bethlehem Catholic, Liberty, Nazareth, Northampton, and Pleasant Valley
West: Allentown Central Catholic, Easton, Emmaus, Freedom, and Parkland
Dieruff, East Stroudsburg North, East Stroudsburg South, Pocono Mountain East, Pocono Mountain West, Stroudsburg, Whitehall, and William Allen do not participate in boys lacrosse.

District and state championships

Girls lacrosse
Girls lacrosse uses the following adjusted divisional conference alignment:
Mountain: Nazareth, Northampton, and Pleasant Valley
Steel: Easton, Freedom, Liberty
Skyline: Allentown Central Catholic, Emmaus, and Parkland
Bethlehem Catholic, Dieruff, East Stroudsburg North, East Stroudsburg South, Pocono Mountain East, Pocono Mountain West, Stroudsburg, Whitehall, and William Allen do not participate in girls lacrosse.

District and state championships

Boys soccer
Boys soccer uses the primary divisional conference alignment.

Conference Champions

District and state championships

Girls soccer
Girls soccer uses the primary divisional alignment.

Conference champions

District and state championships

Softball
Softball uses the primary divisional alignment.

District and state championships

Boys swimming and diving
Boys swimming and diving does not use the divisional conference alignment. Pleasant Valley and Bethlehem Catholic do not participate in boys swimming and diving. In addition, East Stroudsburg North, East Stroudsburg South, Pocono Mountain East, Pocono Mountain West, and Stroudsburg do not participate in boys diving.

Conference champions

District and state championships

Girls swimming and diving
Girls swimming and diving does not use the divisional conference alignment.  Pleasant Valley and Bethlehem Catholic do not participate in girls swimming and diving. East Stroudsburg North, East Stroudsburg South, Pocono Mountain East, Pocono Mountain West, and Stroudsburg do not participate in girls diving.

Conference champions

District and state championships

Boys track and field
Boys track and field does not use any divisional conference alignment.

Girls track and field
Girls track and field does not use any divisional conference alignment.

Boys tennis
Boys tennis does not use any divisional conference alignment.

District and state championships

Individual state champions:
Dennis Koch (William Allen) – 1960
Rupert/Book (Liberty) – 1961
Colin Delaney (Parkland) – 1988
Tarek El-Bassiouni (Stroudsburg) – 1998
Sean Montgomery (East Stroudsburg South) – 2001

Girls tennis
Girls tennis does not use any divisional conference alignment.

Conference champions

District and state championships

Individual state champions:
Granson/Granson (Freedom) – 1996
Granson/Granson (Freedom) – 1997

Boys volleyball
Boys volleyball does not use any divisional conference alignment. Allentown Central Catholic, East Stroudsburg North, East Stroudsburg South, Pleasant Valley, and Stroudsburg do not participate in boys volleyball.

District and state championships

Girls volleyball
Girls volleyball uses the primary divisional conference alignment.

Conference champions

District and state championships

Wrestling

Wrestling uses the following adjusted divisional conference alignment:
Division A: Allentown Central Catholic, Dieruff, East Stroudsburg South, Easton, Freedom, Nazareth, Parkland, Pocono Mountain East, and William Allen
Division B: Bethlehem Catholic, East Stroudsburg North, Emmaus, Liberty, Northampton, Pleasant Valley, Pocono Mountain West, Stroudsburg, and Whitehall

District and state championships

Individual state champions:

Peter Cicchine (Liberty) – 1940, 135
William Unangst (Liberty) – 1940, 155
John McAuliffe (William Allen) – 1947, 138
Charles Cope (Liberty) – 1947, 154
Dick Rutt (Easton) – 1949, 103
Harold Wilson (Nazareth) – 1954, 120
Steve Micio (Northampton) – 1955, 133
Ed Keglovits (Northampton) – 1955, 154
R. Rohrbach (William Allen) – 1957, 127
William Trexler (William Allen) – 1957, 133
Bart Mosser (Liberty) – 1958, 127
Al Rushatz (William Allen) – 1958, 165
Dick Rushatz (William Allen) – 1959, 95
Doug Koch (Liberty) – 1960, 133
John Eckenrode (Liberty) – 1961, 138
Alton Bowyer (Easton) – 1962, 95
Dick DeWalt (Easton) – 1962, 133
Dave Halulko (Dieruff) – 1964, 127
Chuck Amato (Easton) – 1964, 165
Charles Housner (Dieruff) – 1965, 145
Randy Biggs (Liberty) – 1967, 95
Geoff Baum (William Allen) – 1967, 180
Craig Fox (Easton) – 1968, 133
Dan Newhard (Dieruff) – 1968, 180
Carl Lutes (Easton) – 1969, 112
Dan Howard (Dieruff) – 1969, 133
Rocco Creazzo (Easton) – 1971, 95
Pat Sculley (Bethlehem Catholic) – 1973, 126
Curt Stanley (Easton) – 1974, 132
Darwin Brodt (Easton) – 1974, 167
Bob Weaver (Easton) – 1975, 98
Rich McIntyre (Freedom) – 1975, 145
Brian Statum (Liberty) – 1975, 155
Bob Weaver (Easton) – 1976, 98
Brian Statum (Liberty) – 1976, 155
Mike Brown (Bethlehem Catholic) – 1976, 185
George Atiyeh (Dieruff) – 1976, UNL
Bob Weaver (Easton) – 1977, 105
Billy Williams (Freedom) – 1977, 145
George Atiyeh (Dieruff) – 1977, UNL
Rich Santoro (Bethlehem Catholic) – 1978, 98
Doug Billig (Parkland) – 1979, 98
Rich Santoro (Bethlehem Catholic) – 1979, 112
Tom Bold (Bethlehem Catholic) – 1979, 138
John Cuvo (Easton) – 1980, 98
Jim Bresnak (Liberty) – 1980, 105
Bernie Brown (Bethlehem Catholic) – 1980, 185
Randy Ascani (Easton) – 1981, 119
Bernie Brown (Bethlehem Catholic) – 1981, 185
Dennis Atiyeh (Dieruff) – 1981, UNL
Jack Cuvo (Easton) – 1983, 98
Mickey Torres (Liberty) – 1983, 112
Jack Cuvo (Easton) – 1984, 98
Sean Finkbeiner (Northampton) – 1984, 145
Andy Voit (Dieruff) – 1984, 185
Jack Cuvo (Easton) – 1985, 105
Gino Capuano (Liberty) – 1985, 138
Scott Schleicher (William Allen) – 1985, 145
John Likins (Bethlehem Catholic) – 1986, 112
Scott Hovan (William Allen) – 1986, 138
Jeff Roth (William Allen) – 1986, 145
Dave Foley (Bethlehem Catholic) – 1987, 105
Scott Hovan (William Allen) – 1987, 145
Brad Silimperi (Nazareth) – 1988, 98
Ty Moore (Freedom) – 1988, 105
Mike Miller (Nazareth) – 1989, 145
Blayne Diacount (Bethlehem Catholic) – 1989, 160
Tony Iasiello (Bethlehem Catholic) – 1989, 171
Moss Grays (Easton) – 1990, 145
Mike Miller (Nazareth) – 1990, 152
Chad Billy (Northampton) – 1991, 112
Ryan Nunamaker (Nazareth) – 1992, 130
Mike Tomsic (Northampton) – 1993, 112
Matt Roth (Parkland) – 1994, 112
Dan Tashner (Nazareth) – 1994, 125
Whitey Chlebove (Northampton) – 1994, 130
Mark Getz (Nazareth) – 1994, 135
Dennis Liberto (Northampton) – 1995, 103
Travis Doto (Nazareth) – 1995, 145
Jamarr Billman (Easton) – 1996, 130
Chris Kelly (Easton) – 1997, 112
Andy Cote (Nazareth) – 1997, 130
Bryan Snyder (Easton) – 1997, 135
Jamarr Billman (Easton) – 1997, 140
Rob Rohn (Nazareth) – 1997, 189
Derek Jenkins (Parkland) – 1998, 145
Christian Luciano (Northampton) – 1998, 171
Jon Trenge (Parkland) – 1998, 189
John Hard (Northampton) – 1998, 275
Jon Trenge (Parkland) – 1999, 189
Steve Itterly (Nazareth) – 1999, 275
Matt Ciasulli (Easton) – 2000, 112
Ryan McCallum (Northampton) – 2000, 130
Jake Giamoni (Easton) – 2000, 135
Matt Ciasulli (Easton) – 2001, 119
Jeff Ecklof (Northampton) – 2001, 125
Gino Fortebuono (Easton) – 2001, 130
Travis Frick (Nazareth) – 2001, 171
Matt Ciasulli (Easton) – 2002, 125
Mike Rogers (Easton) – 2002, 135
Christian Franco (Whitehall) – 2002, 140
David Rivera (Allentown Central Catholic) – 2002, 160
Joey Ecklof (Northampton) – 2003, 135
Jeff Ecklof (Northampton) – 2003, 145
Josh Haines (Northampton) – 2003, 189
Jon Oplinger (Northampton) – 2003, 215
Joe Caramanica (Nazareth) – 2004, 135
Joey Ecklof (Northampton) – 2004, 145
Mike Rogers (Easton) – 2004, 152
Nick Guida (Parkland) – 2004, 171
Josh Haines (Northampton) – 2004, 189
Jon Oplinger (Northampton) – 2004, 215
Tim Darling (Nazareth) – 2005, 130
Joe Caramanica (Nazareth) – 2005, 145
Joey Ecklof (Northampton) – 2005, 152
Bryan Reiss (Emmaus) – 2005, 275
Jordan Oliver (Easton) – 2006, 103
Tim Darling (Nazareth) – 2006, 145
Kegan Handlovic (Easton) – 2007, 112
Jordan Oliver (Easton) – 2007, 119
Tim Darling (Nazareth) – 2007, 152
Justin Wieller (Northampton) – 2007, 215
Kegan Handlovic (Easton) – 2008, 119
Jordan Oliver (Easton) – 2008, 130
Ziad Haddad (Bethlehem Catholic) – 2008, 285
Zach Horan (Nazareth) – 2011, 130
Mitchell Minotti (Easton) – 2011, 140
Michael Ottinger (Parkland) – 2011, 160
Ethan Lizak (Parkland) – 2012, 106
Darian Cruz (Bethlehem Catholic) – 2012, 106
Randy Cruz (Bethlehem Catholic) – 2012, 132
Elliot Riddick (Bethlehem Catholic) – 2012, 170
Ethan Lizak (Parkland) – 2013, 113
Aaron Bradley (Nazareth) – 2013, 285
Darian Cruz (Bethlehem Catholic) – 2013, 120
Jake Riegel (Bethlehem Catholic) – 2014, 106
Luke Karam (Bethlehem Catholic) – 2014, 113
Zeke Moisey (Bethlehem Catholic) – 2014, 126

Eastern Pennsylvania Conference professional and Olympic athletes

The Eastern Pennsylvania Conference is known for producing a considerable number of present and former professional and Olympic athletes, including:

Major League Baseball (MLB)

Former MLB players
Bob Heffner, former pitcher, Boston Red Sox, Cleveland Indians and California Angels (William Allen High School)
Gary Lavelle, former pitcher, Oakland Athletics, San Francisco Giants and Toronto Blue Jays (Liberty High School)
Matt McBride, former infielder, Colorado Rockies and Oakland Athletics (Liberty High School)
Jeff Mutis, former pitcher, Cleveland Indians and Florida Marlins (Allentown Central Catholic High School)
Dave Schneck, former outfielder, New York Mets (Whitehall High School)
Brian Schneider, former catcher, Montreal Expos/Washington Nationals, New York Mets and Philadelphia Phillies (Northampton Area High School)
Curt Simmons, former pitcher, Chicago Cubs, Los Angeles Angels, Philadelphia Phillies, and St. Louis Cardinals (Whitehall High School)

National Basketball Association (NBA)

Current NBA players
Tyrese Martin, shooting guard, Atlanta Hawks (William Allen High School)

Former NBA players
Aaron Gray, former center, Chicago Bulls, Detroit Pistons, New Orleans Hornets, and Sacramento Kings (Emmaus High School)
Darrun Hilliard, former guard, Detroit Pistons and San Antonio Spurs (Liberty High School)
Brant Weidner, former forward, San Antonio Spurs (Parkland High School)

National Football League (NFL)

Current NFL players
Saquon Barkley, running back, New York Giants (Whitehall High School)
Sebastian Joseph-Day, defensive end, Los Angeles Rams (Stroudsburg High School)
Kyzir White, linebacker, Arizona Cardinals (Emmaus High School)
Kenny Yeboah, tight end, New York Jets (Parkland High School)

Former NFL players
Chuck Bednarik, former center and linebacker, Philadelphia Eagles, and member of the Pro Football Hall of Fame (Liberty High School)
Greg DeLong, former tight end, Minnesota Vikings, Baltimore Ravens, and Jacksonville Jaguars (Parkland High School)
Keith Dorney, former offensive tackle, Detroit Lions (Emmaus High School)
Jim Druckenmiller, former quarterback, Miami Dolphins and San Francisco 49ers (Northampton Area High School)
Mike Guman, former running back, Los Angeles Rams (Bethlehem Catholic High School)
Mike Hartenstine, former defensive end, Chicago Bears and Minnesota Vikings (Liberty High School)
Nate Hobgood-Chittick, former defensive tackle, St. Louis Rams, San Francisco 49ers, and Kansas City Chiefs (William Allen High School)
Kyshoen Jarrett, former strong safety, Washington Redskins (East Stroudsburg High School South)
Dan Koppen, former center, Denver Broncos and New England Patriots (Whitehall High School)
Tim Massaquoi, former tight end, Miami Dolphins (Parkland High School)
Ed McCaffrey, former wide receiver, Denver Broncos, New York Giants, and San Francisco 49ers (Allentown Central Catholic High School)
Kim McQuilken, former quarterback, Atlanta Falcons and Washington Redskins (William Allen High School)
Joe Milinichik, former offensive guard, Detroit Lions, Los Angeles Rams, and San Diego Chargers (Emmaus High School)
Matt Millen, former linebacker, Oakland Raiders, San Francisco 49ers, and Washington Redskins (Whitehall High School)
Jim Molinaro, former offensive tackle, Dallas Cowboys and Washington Redskins (Bethlehem Catholic High School)
James Mungro, former running back, Indianapolis Colts (East Stroudsburg High School South)
Chris Neild, former nose tackle, Houston Texans (Stroudsburg High School)
Artie Owens, former running back, San Diego Chargers, Buffalo Bills, and New Orleans Saints (Stroudsburg High School)
Ken Parrish, former punter, Atlanta Falcons (East Stroudsburg High School South)
Andre Reed, former wide receiver, Buffalo Bills and Washington Redskins, and member of the Pro Football Hall of Fame class of 2014 (Dieruff High School)
Mike Reichenbach, former linebacker, Philadelphia Eagles and Miami Dolphins (Liberty High School)
Ray Rissmiller, former offensive tackle, Buffalo Bills, Philadelphia Eagles, and New Orleans Saints (Easton Area High School)
Larry Seiple, former punter, Miami Dolphins (William Allen High School)
John Spagnola, former tight end, Green Bay Packers, Philadelphia Eagles, and Seattle Seahawks (Bethlehem Catholic High School)
Tony Stewart, former tight end, Cincinnati Bengals, Oakland Raiders, and Philadelphia Eagles (Allentown Central Catholic High School)
Devin Street, former wide receiver, Dallas Cowboys, Houston Texans, Indianapolis Colts, New England Patriots, and New York Jets (Liberty High School)
Jimmy Terwilliger, former quarterback, Minnesota Vikings (East Stroudsburg High School South)
Kevin White, former wide receiver, Chicago Bears, New Orleans Saints, and San Francisco 49ers (Emmaus High School)
Andre Williams, former running back, Los Angeles Chargers and New York Giants (Parkland High School)
Joe Williams, former running back, San Francisco 49ers (Emmaus High School)
Joe Wolf, former offensive tackle, Arizona Cardinals (William Allen High School)

Arena Football League (AFL)
Kevin Nagle, former fullback and linebacker, Colorado Crush and Orlando Predators (Pleasant Valley High School)

NCAA football
Steve Aponavicius, former placekicker, Boston College Eagles football and all-time career highest Boston College scorer (Easton Area High School)
Dan Kendra, former quarterback, Florida State Seminoles football (Bethlehem Catholic High School)

Olympics

Olympic cycling
Tanya Lindenmuth, 2000 Summer Olympics track cycling (Freedom High School)
Marty Nothstein, 2000 Summer Olympics gold medal winner, track cycling (Emmaus High School)
Lauren Tamayo, 2012 Summer Olympics, silver medalist, track cycling (Allentown Central Catholic High School)

Olympic field hockey
Cindy Werley, 1996 Summer Olympics women's field hockey player (Emmaus High School)

Olympic gymnastics
Hope Spivey, 1988 Summer Olympics gymnast (Allentown Central Catholic High School)

Olympic track and field
Joe Kovacs, 2016 Summer Olympics, silver medalist, shot put (Bethlehem Catholic High School)

Olympic wrestling
Joseph Atiyeh, 1984 Summer Olympics, silver medal winner for Syria, wrestling (Dieruff High School)
Stanley Dziedzic, 1976 Summer Olympics bronze medal winner, wrestling (William Allen High School)
Bobby Weaver, 1984 Summer Olympics gold medal winner, wrestling, and 1980 Summer Olympics wrestling team (boycotted) (Easton Area High School)

Professional auto racing
Michael Andretti, former IndyCar Series driver (Nazareth Area High School)
Sage Karam, IndyCar Series driver (Nazareth Area High School)

Professional cycling
Marty Nothstein, former professional track cycling (Emmaus High School)
Nicole Reinhart, former professional track cycling (Emmaus High School)

Professional golf
Jim Booros, former PGA Tour player (Dieruff High School)

Professional soccer
Gina Lewandowski, defender, FC Bayern Munich (Allentown Central Catholic High School)

Track and field
Joe Kovacs, 2015 world champion, shot put (Bethlehem Catholic High School)
Chanelle Price, 2014 IAAF World Indoor Championships, gold medalist, 800 meters (Easton Area High School)

Women's National Basketball Association (WNBA)

Former WNBA players
Michelle M. Marciniak, former point guard, WNBA's Portland Fire and Seattle Storm (Allentown Central Catholic High School)

World Wrestling Entertainment (WWE)
Afa Anoa'i Jr., professional wrestler (Freedom High School)
Dwayne "The Rock" Johnson, former professional wrestler (Freedom High School)
Billy Kidman, former professional wrestler (Parkland High School)
Brian Knobs, former professional wrestler (Whitehall High School)
Jerry Sags, former professional wrestler (Whitehall High School)

Professional and collegiate coaches and managers
Eastern Pennsylvania Conference athletes who have gone on to athletic coaching and team management careers include:

College basketball coaches
Michelle M. Marciniak, former South Carolina Gamecocks women's basketball assistant coach (Allentown Central Catholic High School)
Billy McCaffrey, former St. Bonaventure Bonnies men's basketball head coach (Allentown Central Catholic High School)

College football coaches
Chuck Amato, former NC State Wolfpack football head coach (Easton Area High School)
K. C. Keeler, Sam Houston State Bearkats football head coach, former Delaware Fightin' Blue Hens football head coach, and Rowan University head football coach (Emmaus High School)

College wrestling coaches
John Fritz, former Penn State Nittany Lions wrestling head coach (Liberty High School)
Bob Ferraro, former Bucknell Bison head wrestling coach (Easton Area High School)
Pat Santoro, Lehigh Mountain Hawks head wrestling coach and former Maryland Terrapins head wrestling coach (Bethlehem Catholic High School)
Bryan Snyder, Nebraska Cornhuskers wrestling associate coach (Easton Area High School)
Jay Weiss, Harvard Crimson head wrestling coach (William Allen High School)

National Basketball Association (NBA) coaches
Pete Carril, former Sacramento Kings assistant coach and former Princeton Tigers men's basketball head coach (Liberty High School)
Aaron Gray, former Detroit Pistons assistant coach (Emmaus High School)

National Football League (NFL) coaches and management
Matt Millen, former Detroit Lions  president and general manager (Whitehall High School)

See also
Colonial League
Lehigh Valley Conference
Mountain Valley Conference
PIAA District 11

References

External links
Eastern Pennsylvania Conference official website
Eastern Pennsylvania Conference on Twitter
Eastern Pennsylvania Conference sports news at Lehigh Valley Live
Eastern Pennsylvania Conference sports news at The Morning Call

2014 establishments in Pennsylvania
Lehigh County, Pennsylvania
Monroe County, Pennsylvania
Northampton County, Pennsylvania
Pennsylvania high school sports conferences
Pennsylvania Interscholastic Athletic Association
Pike County, Pennsylvania
Pocono Mountains
Sports in the Lehigh Valley